Wayne Arthurs was the defending champion, but did not participate that year.

James Blake won the title, defeating Lleyton Hewitt 7–5, 2–6, 6–3 in the final.

Seeds

  Lleyton Hewitt (final)
  Nicolas Kiefer (second round, withdrew because of an illness)
  Tommy Robredo (quarterfinals)
  Robby Ginepri (first round)
  James Blake (champion)
  Gaël Monfils (first round)
  Tommy Haas (withdrew because of a shoulder injury)
  Fernando Verdasco (first round)

Draw

Finals

Top half

Bottom half

External links
 2006 Tennis Channel Open Draw
 2006 Tennis Channel Open Qualifying Draw

Singles